Vellum is prepared animal skin or membrane, typically used as writing material. Parchment is another term for this material, from which vellum is sometimes distinguished, when it is made from calfskin, as opposed to that made from other animals, or otherwise being of higher quality.  Vellum is prepared for writing or printing on, to produce single pages, scrolls, codices, or books. 

Modern scholars and custodians increasingly use only the less specific, potentially-confusing term "membrane". Depending on factors such as the method of preparation it may be very hard to determine the animal species involved (let alone its age) without using a laboratory, and the term avoids the need to distinguish between vellum and parchment.

Vellum is generally smooth and durable, although there are great variations depending on preparation and the quality of the skin. The manufacture involves the cleaning, bleaching, stretching on a frame (a "herse"), and scraping of the skin with a crescent-shaped knife (a "lunarium" or "lunellum"). To create tension, scraping is alternated with wetting and drying. A final finish may be achieved by abrading the surface with pumice, and treating with a preparation of lime or chalk to make it accept writing or printing ink.

Modern "paper vellum" is made of synthetic plant material, and is called such for its usage and quality similarities. Paper vellum is used for a variety of purposes including tracing, technical drawings, plans and blueprints.

Terminology

The word "vellum" is borrowed from Old French vélin 'calfskin', derived in turn from the Latin word vitulinum 'made from calf'. However, in Europe, from Roman times, the word was used for the best quality of prepared skin, regardless of the animal from which the hide was obtained. Calf, sheep, and goat were all commonly used, and other animals, including pig, deer, donkey, horse, or camel were used on occasion. The best quality, "uterine vellum", was said to be made from the skins of stillborn or unborn animals, although the term was also applied to fine quality skins made from young animals. However, there has long been much blurring of the boundaries between these terms. In 1519, William Horman could write in his Vulgaria: "That stouffe that we wrytte upon, and is made of beestis skynnes, is somtyme called parchement, somtyme velem, somtyme abortyve, somtyme membraan." Writing in 1936, Lee Ustick explained that:

French sources, closer to the original etymology, tend to define velin as from calf only, while the British Standards Institution defines parchment as made from the split skin of several species, and vellum from the unsplit skin. In the usage of modern practitioners of the artistic crafts of writing, illuminating, lettering, and bookbinding, "vellum" is normally reserved for calfskin, while any other skin is called "parchment".

Manufacture

Vellum is a translucent material produced from the skin, often split, of a young animal. The skin is washed with water and lime (Calcium hydroxide). It is then soaked in lime for several days to soften and remove the hair. 
Once clear, the two sides of the skin are distinct: the side facing inside the animal and the hair side. The "inside body side" of the skin is usually the lighter and more refined of the two. The hair follicles may be visible on the outer side, together with any scarring made while the animal was alive. The membrane can also show the pattern of the animal's vein network called the "veining" of the sheet.

Any remaining hair is removed ("scudding") and the skin is dried by attaching it to a frame (a "herse"). The skin is attached at points around the circumference with cords; to prevent tearing, the maker wraps the area of the skin to which the cord is to be attached around a pebble (a "pippin"). The maker then uses a crescent shaped knife, (a "lunarium" or "lunellum"), to clean off any remaining hairs.

Once the skin is completely dry, it is thoroughly cleaned and processed into sheets. The number of sheets extracted from the piece of skin depends on the size of the skin and the given dimensions requested by the order. For example, the average calfskin could provide roughly three and a half medium sheets of writing material. This can be doubled when it is folded into two conjoint leaves, also known as a bifolium. Historians have found evidence of manuscripts where the scribe wrote down the medieval instructions now followed by modern membrane makers. The membrane is then rubbed with a round, flat object ("pouncing") to ensure that the ink would adhere to the surface. Even so, ink would gradually flake off of the membrane, especially if it was used in a scroll that was frequently rolled and unrolled.

Manuscripts

Preparing manuscripts
Once the vellum is prepared, traditionally a quire is formed of a group of several sheets. Raymond Clemens and Timothy Graham point out, in their Introduction to Manuscript Studies, that "the quire was the scribe's basic writing unit throughout the Middle Ages". Guidelines are then made on the membrane. They note "'pricking' is the process of making holes in a sheet of parchment (or membrane) in preparation of its ruling. The lines were then made by ruling between the prick marks ...The process of entering ruled lines on the page to serve as a guide for entering text. Most manuscripts were ruled with horizontal lines that served as the baselines on which the text was entered and with vertical bounding lines that marked the boundaries of the columns".

Usage
Most of the finer sort of medieval manuscripts, whether illuminated or not, were written on vellum. Some Gandharan Buddhist texts were written on vellum, and all Sifrei Torah (Hebrew: ספר תורה Sefer Torah; plural: ספרי תורה, Sifrei Torah) are written on kosher klaf or vellum.

A quarter of the 180 copy edition of Johannes Gutenberg's first Bible printed in 1455 with movable type was also printed on vellum, presumably because his market expected this for a high-quality book. Paper was used for most book-printing, as it was cheaper and easier to process through a printing press and to bind.

The twelfth century Winchester Bible was printed on 250 calfskins, with a need of over 2,000 hides to be collected for the preparation and creation of the bible.

In art, vellum was used for paintings, especially if they needed to be sent long distances, before canvas became widely used in about 1500, and continued to be used for drawings, and watercolours. Old master prints were sometimes printed on vellum, especially for presentation copies, until at least the seventeenth century.

Limp vellum or limp-parchment bindings were used frequently in the 16th and 17th centuries, and were sometimes gilt but were also often not embellished. In later centuries vellum has been more commonly used like leather, that is, as the covering for stiff board bindings. Vellum can be stained virtually any color but seldom is, as a great part of its beauty and appeal rests in its faint grain and hair markings, as well as its warmth and simplicity.

Lasting in excess of 1,000 years—for example, Pastoral Care (Troyes, Bibliothèque Municipale, MS 504), dates from about 600 and is in excellent condition—animal vellum can be far more durable than paper. For this reason, many important documents are written on animal vellum, such as diplomas. Referring to a diploma as a "sheepskin" alludes to the time when diplomas were written on vellum made from animal hides.

Modern usage
British Acts of Parliament are still printed on vellum for archival purposes, as are those of the Republic of Ireland.  In February 2016, the UK House of Lords announced that legislation would be printed on archive paper instead of the traditional vellum from April 2016. However, Cabinet Office Minister Matthew Hancock intervened by agreeing to fund the continued use of vellum from the Cabinet Office budget. On 2017, the House of Commons Commission agreed that it would provide front and back vellum covers for record copies of Acts. 

Today, because of low demand and complicated manufacturing process, animal vellum is expensive and hard to find. The only UK company still producing traditional parchment and vellum is William Cowley (established 1870), which is based in Newport Pagnell, Buckinghamshire. A modern imitation is made of cotton. Known as paper vellum, this material is considerably cheaper than animal vellum and can be found in most art and drafting supply stores. Some brands of writing paper and other sorts of paper use the term "vellum" to suggest quality.

Vellum is still used for Jewish scrolls, of the Torah in particular, for luxury book-binding, memorial books, and for various documents in calligraphy.  It is also used on instruments such as the banjo and the bodhran, although synthetic skins are available for these instruments and have become more commonly used.

The Catholic Church still issues its decrees and diplomas for its officials in Vellum.

Paper vellum
Modern imitation vellum is made from plasticized rag cotton or fibers from interior tree bark. Terms include: paper vellum, Japanese vellum, and vegetable vellum. Paper vellum is usually translucent and its various sizes are often used in applications where tracing is required, such as architectural plans.  Its dimensions are more stable than a linen or paper sheet, which is frequently critical in the development of large scaled drawings such as blueprints. Paper vellum has also become extremely important in hand or chemical reproduction technology for dissemination of plan copies. Like a high-quality traditional vellum, paper vellum could be produced thin enough to be virtually transparent to strong light, enabling a source drawing to be used directly in the reproduction of field-used drawings.

Preservation

Vellum is ideally stored in a stable environment with constant temperature and 30% (± 5%) relative humidity. If vellum is stored in an environment with less than 11% relative humidity, it becomes fragile, brittle, and susceptible to mechanical stresses; if it is stored in an environment with greater than 40% relative humidity, it becomes vulnerable to gelation and to mold or fungus growth. Additionally, the relative humidity needed to properly store vellum is not compatible with optimal humidity level for storage of paper, which can pose a challenge for libraries.

See also
 History of hide materials
 Calfskin
 Parchment

Notes

References
 
 Hepler, Dana J., Paul Ross Wallach, Donald Hepler, "Drafting" in Drafting and Design for Architecture & Construction, 9th edition, 2012, Cengage Learning, 9781111128135, Google Books
 
 Stokes, Roy Bishop, Almagno, Romano Stephen, Esdaile's Manual of Bibliography, 6th edition, 2001, Scarecrow Press, 9780810839229, google books

External links
On-line demonstration of the preparation of vellum from the BNF, Paris—text in French, but mostly visual.

Book design
Calligraphy
Hides (skin)
Writing media